A tangible investment is something physical that you can touch. It is an investment in a tangible, hard or real asset or personal property. This contrasts with financial investments such as stocks, bonds, mutual funds and other financial instruments.

Some assets are held purely for their ability to appreciate, such as collectibles, while others are held for the income they generate while they depreciate, such as equipment held for lease. Others exhibit a combination of properties, appreciating in market value while depreciating in book value, such as rental real estate. Timberland exhibits depletion of timber combined with appreciation of land. Other assets’ values fluctuate with supply and demand, such as commodities, which are liquid investments unlike most other tangible investments. 

These various properties, together with the lack of correlation to traditional asset class values, make tangible investments a means of reducing overall investment risk through diversification.

Types 
All of the following are tangible investments:
 Businesses
 Real estate and land
 Infrastructure as an asset class (as opposed to traditional government-funded infrastructure)
 Commodities and natural resources such as industrial and precious metals and minerals, oil, agricultural commodities, fish, livestock and forestry
 Collectibles of all kinds, including:
 Antiques and ancient artifacts
 Fine art
 Postage stamps (see philatelic investment)
 Coins (see coin collecting) and banknotes
 Autographs and historic documents
 Memorabilia, such as political, celebrity, and sports memorabilia
 Firearms and militaria
 Trading cards
 Jewelry and timepieces
 Fine wines and spirits
 Classic cars
 Rare books
 Musical instruments
 Toys

See also 
Tangible assets investment in accounting

References

Investment